The predation problem or predation argument refers to the consideration of the harms experienced by animals due to predation as a moral problem, that humans may or may not have an obligation to work towards preventing. Discourse on this topic has, by and large, been held within the disciplines of animal and environmental ethics. The issue has particularly been discussed in relation to animal rights and wild animal suffering. Some critics have considered an obligation to prevent predation as untenable or absurd and have used the position as a reductio ad absurdum to reject the concept of animal rights altogether. Others have criticized any obligation implied by the animal rights position as environmentally harmful.

Responses from animal ethicists and rights advocates have been varied. Some have rejected the claim that animal rights as a position implies that we are obligated to prevent predation, while others have argued that the animal rights position does imply that predation is something that we should try to avert. Others have asserted that it is not something that we should do anything about now due to the risk that we could inadvertently cause significant harm, but that it is something that we may be able to effectively take action on in the future with improved knowledge and technologies.

Historical views

Problem of evil 

Predation has historically been viewed as a natural evil within the context of the problem of evil and has been considered a moral concern for Christians who have engaged with theodicy. Natural evils have been sometimes thought of as something that humans should work towards alleviating, or as part of a greater good which justifies the existence of this type of evil. Thomas Aquinas advocated the latter view, arguing that "defects" in nature such as predation led to the "good of another, or even to the universal good" and that if "all evil were prevented, much good would be absent from the universe". Within Christian and Hebrew Scripture, there are several prophecies which describe a future Heaven or Earth where predation is no longer a feature of nature, including Isaiah's prophecy that "[t]he wolf shall live with the lamb, the leopard shall lie down with the kid, the calf and the lion and the fatling together, and a little child shall lead them."

In his notebooks (written between 1487 and 1505), Leonardo da Vinci questioned why nature was not structured in a way which meant that animals were not forced to consume each other to survive. David Hume made several observations about predation and suffering experienced by wild animals in Dialogues Concerning Natural Religion (1779), stating that the "stronger prey upon the weaker, and keep them in perpetual terror and anxiety".

William Paley, in Natural Theology, described predation as being the most challenging of God's work to establish the utility of, nevertheless, he defended predation as the means to deal with the potentially catastrophic effects of animals producing more offspring than can possibly survive.

The debate around predation and the problem of evil was significantly increased by the popularization of Charles Darwin's theory of natural selection. Some earlier Christians argued that violence in nature was a result of the fall of man, but evidence that predation has existed for millions of years before the evolution of humans and the concept of sin, indicates that while life has existed, there has never been a time where nature has been free from violence. Darwin himself questioned how the fact that the Ichneumonidae prey on the bodies of living caterpillars could be reconciled with the idea of an omnibenevolent God.

Criticism of moral judgements 
Plutarch criticised the labelling of carnivorous animals such as lions, tigers and snakes as barbarous because for them killing is a necessity while for humans who can live off of "nature's beneficent fruits" killing is a "luxury and crime".

The writer Edward Augustus Kendall discussed predation in his book of moral fables The Canary Bird (1799), in which he argued that predatory behavior by animals should not be judged by human moral standards and that "a prejudice against particular creatures, for fancied acts of cruelty is absurd".

Philosophical pessimism 
Giacomo Leopardi, the Italian poet and philosopher, in Operette morali (1827) engaged in a dialogue with Nature in "Dialogue between Nature and an Icelander", which uses the inevitability of predation—such as a squirrel fleeing from a rattlesnake, only to run into the snake's open mouth—as a moral indictment on nature's cannibalism of its own offspring. The inevitability of such cycles of destruction and creation was a cause for Leopardi's philosophical pessimism. In Zibaldone, published posthumously in 1898, Leopardi argued that predation is the ultimate indication of the evil design of nature.

Similar to Leopardi, the German philosopher Arthur Schopenhauer, in 1851, used the pain experienced by an animal being devoured by another as a refutation against the idea that the "pleasure in the world outweighs the pain".

Animal rights 
Lewis Gompertz, an early animal rights advocate, and one of the first contemporary authors to address the problem of wild animal suffering, in the fifth chapter of his 1824 book Moral Inquiries on the Situation of Man and of Brutes, engaged in a dialogue, in which he asserted that animals devouring each other can be judged as wrong by the rules that we use to govern human lives and stated that "should I witness the attempt in any animal of destroying another, I would endeavour to frustrate it; though this might probably be wrong." He went on to argue that the extinction of carnivorous species would not be bad, claiming that the species of one animal is not more important than an equal number of another and that it would be possible for some carnivorous animals, like wolves, to instead sustain themselves on vegetables.

The American zoologist and animal rights philosopher J. Howard Moore, in The New Ethics (1907), labelled carnivorous species as "criminal" races whose "existence is a continual menace to the peace and well-being of the world" because the "fullness of their lives is dependent upon the emptiness and destruction of others". In the pamphlet Why I Am a Vegetarian, published in 1895, Moore described the Carnivora as "relentless brutes", whose existence is a travesty for ethics, justice and mercy. In Better-World Philosophy (1899), Moore argued that carnivorousness was the result of excessive egoism, a product of natural selection, stating "Life riots on life—tooth and talon, beak and paw". He went on to claim that the irredeemable nature of carnivorous species meant that they could not be reconciled with each other in his ideal arrangement of the universe, which he called a "Confederation of the Consciousnesses".

In 1903, the Scottish philosopher David G. Ritchie in response to Henry S. Salt's 1892 book Animals' Rights, claimed that giving animals rights would imply that we must "protect the weak among them against the strong" and to achieve this, carnivorous animals should be put to death or slowly starved by "permanent captivity and vegetarian diet". He considered this proposal absurd, stating that the "declaration of the rights of every creeping thing [is] to remain a mere hypocritical formula to gratify pug-loving sentimentalists".

Contemporary views

Animal ethics 
In 1973, Australian philosopher Peter Singer argued that if humans were to try to prevent predation, such as from stopping lions killing gazelles, that it would likely increase the "net amount of animal suffering", but asserted that if hypothetically we could reduce suffering in the long-term, then it would be right to intervene.

The English philosopher Stephen R. L. Clark's "The Rights of Wild Things" (1979) is considered to be one of the first ethics papers to explicitly engage with predation as a problem. In the paper, Clark argues that the concept that humans are obligated to aid animals against predators is not absurd, but that it follows only in the abstract, not in practice.

Animal rights philosopher, Tom Regan in his 1983 book, The Case for Animal Rights, argued that humans have no obligation to prevent predation because carnivorous animals are not moral agents and as a result cannot violate the rights of the animals that they predate. Along these lines, Julius Kapembwa argues that "intervention in predation is neither required nor permitted by animal rights theory".

Steve Sapontzis, in his 1984 paper "Predation" argues against the idea that the problem of predation is a reductio ad absurdum for animal rights, instead, he claims that if we accept the view that we have an obligation to reduce avoidable animal suffering, then predation is something that we should work towards preventing if we can do so without inflicting greater suffering. Sapontzis concludes that whether humans choose to fulfil this particular obligation, or attempt to reduce other forms of avoidable suffering, is a question of where humans can do the most good.

In a 2003 paper, the economist Tyler Cowen advocates, from a utility, rights and holistic perspective, for the policing of nature to reduce the predatory activity of certain animals to help their victims.

The transhumanist philosopher David Pearce, in his 2009 essay, "Reprogramming Predators", claims that predation is an immense source of suffering in the world and that a "biosphere without suffering is technically feasible". He argues for the phased extinction of carnivorous species using immunocontraceptives or "reprogramming" them using gene editing so that their descendants become herbivores. Pearce lists and argues against a number of justifications used by people who think that suffering caused by predation does not matter and that it should be conserved in its current state, including a "television-based conception of the living world", "[s]elective realism" and "[a]daptive empathy deficits".

In 2010, Jeff McMahan published "The Meat Eaters", an op-ed for the New York Times on predation as a moral issue, in which he argued that preventing the massive amounts of suffering and death caused by predation would be a good thing and that the extinction of carnivorous species could be instrumentally good if this could be achieved without inflicting "ecological upheaval involving more harm than would be prevented by the end of predation". McMahan received a number of objections to his arguments and responded to these in another op-ed published in the same year, "Predators: A Response". He later published his arguments as a chapter titled "The Moral Problem of Predation", in the 2015 book Philosophy Comes to Dinner.

Peter Vallentyne argues that it is permissible for humans to intervene to help prey in limited ways, if the cost to humans is minimal, but that we should not eliminate predators. In the same way that we aid humans in need, when the cost to humans is minimal, humans might help wild animals in limited circumstances.

Martha Nussbaum asserts that the predation problem and what should be done to solve it should be the subject of serious discussion, also arguing that there should be research into future solutions. Nussbaum draws attention to a need to convince people that predation is a problem and to challenge the common conception of predation as exciting and enthralling, which she believes has a negative impact on human culture. She goes on to challenge the idea of animals, who are preyed upon, as existing to be food for other animals, rather than being made to live for their own lives. Nussbaum concludes that humans, who have extensive control over animal lives and habitats, need to face up to their responsibilities towards wild animals and work towards their flourishing, rather than harming them.

Some ethicists have made concrete proposals for reducing or preventing predation, including stopping the reintroduction of predators in locations where they have previously gone extinct, and removing predators from wild areas.

Environmental ethics 
In 1984, the British ecologist Felicity A. Huntingford published "Some ethical issues raised by studies of predation and aggression", in which she discusses ethical issues and implications regarding the staging of artificial encounters for studies of predator-prey interactions.

In the context of ecology, predation is considered to play a crucial and necessary role in ecosystems. This has led some writers, such as Michael Pollan, to reject predation as being a moral problem at all, stating "predation is not a matter of morality or politics; it, also, is a matter of symbiosis". Under Aldo Leopold's land ethic, native predators, as crucial components of biotic communities, are considered important to conserve. 

The environmental philosopher J. Baird Callicott asserts that the implication of animal rights theory, namely that we should protect animals from predators, would "[n]ot only [result in] the (humane) eradication of predators destroy the community, it would destroy the species which are the intended beneficiaries of this misplaced morality. Many prey species depend upon predators to optimize their populations." Holmes Rolston III views predation as an essential natural process and driver of evolution, that is a "sad good" to be respected and valued. Ty Raterman, an environmentalist, has argued that predation is something that can be lamented without implying that we have an obligation to prevent it.

The environmental ethicist William Lynn has argued that from a welfare perspective predation "is necessary for the well-being of predators and prey" and essential for the maintenance of the integrity of the ecological communities. Larry Rasmussen, a Christian environmental ethicist, has argued that predation is "not a pattern of morality we praise and advocate".

Other uses of the term 
"Predation problem" can also refer to the predation of animals who belong to species considered valuable to humans for economic reasons or conservation, such as domestic sheep predation by coyotes, farmed salmon predation by seals, the predation of animals who are hunted for sport or food and cat predation of wild animals; culling or removal of predatory animals may be carried out to reduce such incidents.

See also 
 Relationship between animal ethics and environmental ethics

References

Further reading 
 
 
 
 

Wild animal suffering
Philosophical problems
problem